John H. Devlin (May 27, 1891 – July 20, 1967) is a former Democratic member of the Pennsylvania State Senate who served from 1961 until his death in 1967. He also served in the Pennsylvania House of Representatives.

Before serving in the Pennsylvania House of Representatives, Devlin served as a special agent of the FBI (1940-1947), was a real estate deputy for the Allegheny County Sheriff (1947-1951), had a legal practice in 1951, and was Assistant D.A. of Allegheny County (1956-1964).

References

1967 deaths
People from Allegheny County, Pennsylvania
Democratic Party Pennsylvania state senators
Democratic Party members of the Pennsylvania House of Representatives
1891 births
20th-century American politicians